Orpah ( ʿOrpā, meaning "neck" or "fawn") is a woman mentioned in the Book of Ruth in the Hebrew Bible. She was from Moab and was the daughter-in-law of Naomi and wife of Chilion. After the death of her husband, Orpah and her sister-in-law Ruth wished
to go to Judea with Naomi. However, Naomi tried to persuade both Ruth and Orpah to return to their people and to their gods. Ruth chose to remain with Naomi, but Orpah chose to return to her people and her gods. (Ruth i. 4 et seq.).

In rabbinic literature, Orpah is identified with Herse, the mother of the four Philistine giants, one of whom was Goliath. These four sons were said to have been given her for the four tears which she shed at parting with her mother-in-law (Babylonian Talmud, Sotah 42b). Her other name Harafa is cognate of the word for threshing; that she allowed herself to be "threshed" by many men as one would thresh wheat (Babylonian Talmud, Sotah 42b).

The Sanhedrin tractate in the Talmud says that she was killed by King David's general Abishai, the son of Zeruiah, with her own spindle.

References

Biblical figures in rabbinic literature
Book of Ruth
Moab
People from Bethlehem
Women in the Hebrew Bible
Goliath